Clementino, stage name of Clemente Maccaro (Cimitile, 21 December 1982), is an Italian rapper proficient in freestyle in both Italian and Neapolitan language. He, along with rapper Fabri Fibra, is member of the group Rapstar. After winning several freestyle competitions between 2004 and 2006, he signed a contract with the independent record label Lynx Records, releasing the debut album Napolimanicomio in 2006. Three years later he joined Videomind, releasing IENA in 2011, and in 2012 he formed the Rapstars with Fabri Fibra, In 2013 the rapper signed a contract with the record label Universal, publishing shortly afterwards Mea culpa, who had a moderate success in the motherland, reaching fourth position in the FIMI Album Ranking and being certified a gold record.

Solo career
Growing up in the Neapolitan hinterland between Cimitile and Nola, Clementino at the age of 14 took his first steps in hip hop in Naples where he joined the Trema Crew and took place in the Neapolitan group TCK. Thanks to these first experiences, Clementino has the opportunity to refine his techniques in freestyle 2004, Da Bomb 2005, Valvarap 2006 and 2theBeat 2006, beating Ensi, then defending champion in the final, who already in 2005 defeated the same Clementino.

Napolimanicomio (2006-2008)
On April 29, 2006 he released his first studio album, entitled Napolimanicomio, sung both in Italian and in Neapolitan, and in collaboration with renowned artists such as OneMic, Kiave, Francesco Paura, Spregiudicati, as well as various important local exponents such as Kapwan, Emcee O'Zi and Patto MC, achieving a moderate success and increasing his fame nationally.
After the release of his first album, Clementino embarked on a series of concerts that saw him sing on more than 200 dates throughout Italy.

Videomind and I.E.N.A (2009-2011)
In late 2009 he collaborated with DJ Tayone and the rapper Francesco Paura, creating the Videomind group, with which he released the album Afterparty in 2010, whose publication is anticipated by the single Is normal, with its video clip. second single, Music Therapy, and two further video clips (L'immenso e Peter Pan).

On December 19, 2011 he released his second solo album, entitled I.E.N.A., acronym for "I and no one else". This name is given by the fact that the album is a collection of songs concerning only and only himself. The disc is anticipated by the music video of La mia musica, released just over a year earlier. The name Iena (or more frequently Iena White) also derives from the alter ego of Clementino, also chosen to indicate the analogy between himself and the animal, which "left the carcass of the opponents on the ground", as stated by him in an interview.

The activity with Fabri Fibra and the collateral experiences (2012)
The activity with Fabri Fibra and the collateral experiences (2012) The same topic in detail: Rapstar and Non è gratis.
Ci rimani male / Chimica Brother comes out on January 9, 2012, single double in collaboration with the famous rapper Fabri Fibra which will precede the release of Non è gratis, a project that sees Clementino alongside Fabri Fibra himself in the musical duo Rapstar, a partnership between the mainstream and underground hip hop. On January 20 of the same year the second video clip extracted from I.E.N.A., Toxico was released, while the third, Rovine, was extracted on March 4.

From February 8 to February 12, 2012 Clementino starred in Pino Quartullo's play Che che è è ?, based on the 1989 film by the same name by Ettore Scola.

On March 9, the single La luce is extracted from Non è gratis, a piece totally focused on the life of Clementino, who in the passage talks about his repentances and all the mistakes made at a young age. Also on this date, the MTV channel aired the first edition of MTV Spit, a television program that will see Clementino confronting other rappers in various freestyle challenges.

In the following months three further video clips are extracted from I.E.N.A .: Laughter of an I.E.N.A., Funk and TheRivati and Animals.

On September 25, Clementino took part in the Hip Hop TV 4th B-Day Party, held at the Mediolanum Forum in Assago, together with the best Italian rappers.

On December 7, the promo of a new song, entitled Atomic Bomb, is released, which anticipates the publication of Armageddon, an album that will see the participation of rapper Dope One and beatmaker O'Luwong. The video clip of the song was published on December 21, 2012, on the occasion of the achievement of the fateful date on which, according to some apocalyptic theories, the end of the world would have occurred.

Discography

Albums

Solo
2006 - Napolimanicomio
2011 - I.E.N.A.
2013 - Mea Culpa
2015 - Miracolo!
2017 - Vulcano
2019 - Tarantelle

With Videomind
2010 - Afterparty

With Rapstar
2012 - Non è gratis

Compilations
2005 - Napolizm

Singles

Solo
2010: La mia musica
2012: Toxico
2012: Rovine
2013: O' vient
2015: Fumo
2019: Chi vuol essere milionario feat. Fabri Fibra

With Rapstar
2012: Ci rimani male/Chimica Brother
2012: La luce

References

Living people
Italian rappers
1982 births